Nouvelle-Église (English: New Church) is a commune in the Pas-de-Calais department in the Hauts-de-France region of France.

Geography
Nouvelle-Église lies about 6 miles (9 km) east of Calais, at the junction of the D229 and the D219 roads, half a mile from junction 50 of the A16 autoroute.

Population

Places of interest
 The church of Notre-Dame, dating from the nineteenth century.

See also
Communes of the Pas-de-Calais department

References

Nouvelleeglise
Pas-de-Calais communes articles needing translation from French Wikipedia
Pale of Calais